The NHK Mile Cup is a Grade 1 flat horse race in Japan for three-year-old thoroughbred colts and fillies, run over a distance of 1,600 metres (approximately one mile) on the turf at Tokyo Racecourse in May.

The NHK Mile Cup is sponsored by the Japanese public broadcasting organization NHK, and as such, this race is broadcast not only on Fuji TV (one of NHK's competitors) but on one of the NHK channels that cover horse racing (NHK General TV; the other, BS-1, covers certain other races such as the Japan Cup). (In Japanese horseracing, "Sponsor" doesn't mean the man or organisation provide prize money. They provide only the prize, cup, trophy etc.)

Before the year 2001, it was the only colt and fillies G1 race that non-Japanese bred three-year-olds could participate, which led to this race being considered as the "Japanese Derby for non-Japanese bred horse" until foreign-bred horse restrictions were lifted in 2001. Until 2010 it was limited to domestic-trained horses, but these restrictions were removed that year (along with the Japanese classics). A maximum of nine foreign horses are allowed entry in the NHK Mile Cup. It is considered one of the prep races for both the Yushun Himba (the Japanese Oaks) and the Tokyo Yushun (the Japanese Derby).

Step races 

The New Zealand Trophy is the only formal trial race for NHK Mile Cup. The top three finishers of that race will be granted participation right in this race. If a horse from the National Association of Racing (NAR) finished in top three in the New Zealand Trophy, at most of two extra participation rights will be issued within the other four races.

Winners
(Winners in italic are also later winners from either Yushun Himba or Tokyo Yushun that year)

See also
 Horse racing in Japan
 List of Japanese flat horse races

References
Racing Post: 

Horse races in Japan
Turf races in Japan
Flat horse races for three-year-olds
NHK